The 2018 Summer Youth Olympics medal table is a list of National Olympic Committees (NOCs) ranked by the number of gold medals won by their athletes during the 2018 Summer Youth Olympics, held in Buenos Aires, Argentina, from 6 to 18 October 2018.

Of the nations that won medals at these Games, two had not won an Olympic medal nor Youth Olympic medal, Honduras and Saint Lucia. Burundi, Iceland, Malaysia, Mauritius, Qatar and Saudi Arabia won their first gold medal at an Olympic/Youth Olympic event, having previously only won silver and bronze medals. Afghanistan, Algeria, Kosovo, Luxembourg, Macedonia, Mauritius, Niger, Philippines, Sri Lanka and United Arab Emirates won their first ever Youth Olympics medals.

Medal table 
The Organising Committee is not keeping an official medal tally. The ranking in this table is based on information provided by the International Olympic Committee (IOC) and is consistent with IOC convention in its published medal tables. By default, the table is ordered by the number of gold medals the athletes from a nation have won (in this context, a "nation" is an entity represented by a National Olympic Committee). The number of silver medals is taken into consideration next and then the number of bronze medals. If nations are still tied, equal ranking is given and they are listed alphabetically.

Two gold medals were awarded for a first-place tie in the Mixed BMX freestyle park event. No silver medal was awarded as a consequence. Two silver medals were awarded for a second-place tie in the Boys' 50 m butterfly swimming,  Boys' IKA Twin Tip Racing and Girls' IKA Twin Tip Racing events. No bronze medal was awarded as a consequence.

In November 2019, in the girls' +63 kg event in weightlifting, Thailand gold medallist had tested positive for a banned substance, and the medal was stripped. As a result, Turkey was raised from a silver to gold medal, Uzbekistan from the bronze medal to silver and New Zealand received a bronze medal.

In judo (9), karate (6) and taekwondo (10) two bronze medals are awarded in each event (25 additional bronze medals total). Additionally, two bronze medals were awarded for a third-place tie in the girls' 50 m butterfly swimming and girls' 50 m freestyle swimming events.

References

External links
IOC medal table 
Insidethegames Medal table

2018 Summer Youth Olympics
Summer Youth Olympics medal tables